Villa Gonzalez is a municipality (municipio) of the Santiago province in the Dominican Republic. Within the municipality there are two municipal districts (distritos municipal): El Limón and Palmar Arriba.

Geography

Economy
The area produces some of the finest tobacco in the Dominican Republic.

Notable residents
José Armando Castillo, baseball and fastpitch softball player for Dominican national teams
Raynel Espinal, professional baseball player
Asela Mera de Jorge, politician and activist
Ramón Morel, professional baseball player
José Reyes, professional baseball player
Antonio Santos, professional baseball player

References

Populated places in Santiago Province (Dominican Republic)
Municipalities of the Dominican Republic